The World According to RZA is a compilation album featuring the production of Wu-Tang Clan member RZA that features his tracks for emcees from a variety of European countries. The album was never released in the United States.

The Making of the album
In an interview with Skruff.com, RZA spoke about the making of this album.

Track listing
RZA - "Intro" 2:14
Feven - "Mesmerize" 3:54
Petter - "Det e så jag känner" 3:06
RZA feat. Diaz, Petter & Feven (Scandinavian Allstars) - "On tha Ground" 4:05
RZA feat. Diaz - "The North Sea" 3:39
RZA - "Saïan Intro" 0:54
RZA featuring Ghostface Killah & Saïan Supa Crew - "Saïan" 4:10
Bams feat. U-God - "Please, Tends l'Oreille" 3:58
Nap - "Warning" 5:04
Passi feat. RCFA - "Dedicace" 4:47
RZA feat. IAM - "Seul Face à Lui" 4:14
Xavier Naidoo feat. Deborah Cox - "Souls on Fire" 4:47
Curse - "Ich Weiss (On My Mind)" 2:51
Afrob & Sekou - "Black Star Line-Up" 4:12
RZA feat. Xavier Naidoo - "I've Never Seen ..." 5:13
RZA feat. Blade, Skinnyman & Ti2bs - "Boing, Boing" 4:48
Bronz'n'blak - "Make Money, Money" 3:55
Frankie Hi-NRG MC - "Passaporto per Resistere" 3:02
Fuat ergin, Bektas & Germ - "Uzaktan Gelen Ses" 4:21

The New Version contains the German song "Hotel" by Kool Savas feat. Eko Fresh & Valezka instead of "Warning" by Nap and "I've Never Seen..." is replaced with the German version of it titled "Ich Kenne Nichts (Das So Schön Ist Wie Du)". RZA's verse is not included on this track. The original version of the album is out of print and very hard to find.

References

Albums produced by RZA
RZA albums
2003 compilation albums
Virgin Records compilation albums